Karnataka does not recognise same-sex marriages or civil unions.

Legal history

Background
Marriage in India is governed under several federal laws. These laws allow for the solemnisation of marriages according to different religions. Every citizen has the right to choose which law will apply to them based on their community or religion. These laws are the Hindu Marriage Act, 1955, which governs matters of marriage, separation and divorce for Hindus according to Hindu custom and rites, the Indian Christian Marriage Act, 1872, which regulates the marriage and divorce of Christians, the Muslim Personal Law (Shariat) Application Act, 1937, for matters concerning the marriage, succession and inheritance of Muslims, the Parsi Marriage and Divorce Act, 1936, concerning the marriage and divorce of Parsis, the Anand Marriage Act, 1909, concerning the marriage of Sikhs, and the Special Marriage Act, 1954 (SMA). The SMA allows all Indian citizens to marry regardless of the religion of either party. Marriages contracted under the SMA are registered with the state as a civil contract. The Act applies to partners of all religions or with no religious beliefs as well as to interfaith couples. None of these acts explicitly bans same-sex marriage.

On 14 February 2006, the Supreme Court of India ruled in Smt. Seema v. Ashwani Kumar that the states and union territories are obliged to register all marriages performed under the federal laws. The court's ruling was expected to reduce instances of child marriages, bigamy, cases of domestic violence and unlawful abandonment. Subsequently, the Government of Karnataka published the Karnataka Marriage (Registration and Miscellaneous Provisions) Rules, 2006 in the Karnataka Gazette on 18 April 2006. The Rules provide for the registration of all marriages solemnized in the state irrespective of the religion of the parties. They created a Registrar of Marriages, which shall issue a marriage certificate upon reception of a memorandum of marriage filed by the spouses. The Registrar may refuse to issue the license if the parties fail to meet the requirements to marry under the national law of their religion or community. The marriage certificate requires the names of the "bride" and the "bridegroom". The Karnataka Marriages (Registration and Miscellaneous Provisions) Act, 1976 does not explicitly ban same-sex marriages, and defines marriage simply as including remarriage.

Non-legally recognised marriage ceremonies
Some same-sex couples have married in traditional marriage ceremonies, though the marriages have no legal status in Karnataka. Nived Antony Chullickal and Abdul Rahim, originally from Kerala, were married in Bangalore in December 2019. "I really just wanted to get married to my boyfriend and shared pre-wedding photoshoot, firstly, as a message to everyone that it is better to be late than never and second, it is so good to come out and marry your partner. Our wedding was like any other wedding. I also wanted it to be an inspiration for people, so that they too can do the same, and now so many people have called me and I really feel good that I have been an inspiration for all.", Chullickal told The News Minute.

In 2020, members of the Kodava community called for the "ostracisation" of Dr. Sharath Ponnappa, a Kodava, because he chose to wear traditional Kodava attire, the kupya-chele, at his marriage to Sundeep Dosanj, a Punjabi American, in the United States on 26 September 2020. K. S. Devaiah, the president of the Kodava Samaja in Madikeri, a community group representing Kodava interests, noted that while there had been several instances of inter-caste marriages, this was the first same-sex marriage in the community. "This wedding, where the couple wore traditional Kodava attire, is an insult to the entire community. Hence, after a meeting the members of the Kodava Samaja, we have recommended ostracisation of Sharath Ponnappa from the community. [...] Gay marriage is one thing and wearing sacred Kodava attire to solemnise a gay marriage is another thing. We are against the latter.", said Devaiah. Ponnappa, a California doctor, responded to the controversy, saying, "We knew there would be dissenters, but we have literally been fighting for acceptance since the day we were born, fighting to survive and be treated the same as our peers. However, we proudly choose to live our truth, celebrate our same-sex marriage and encourage the dissenters to open their minds and engage in positive dialogue to understand that all humans are created equally and deserve respect and love." Kodava actor Gulshan Devaiah weighed in, stating, "I look at the picture and they look beautiful and all that matters to me is the coming together of two people who love each other. I see the fact that they decided to wear the Kodava attire as a mark of respect and celebration of the Kodava traditions."

Halakki lesbian marriages
The Halakki Vokkaliga, an indigenous people living in the Uttara Kannada district, have been celebrating traditional lesbian marriages for "so long that none living in the community now knows when and how it began". After the procession and rituals, the newly-weds, both of whom are dressed in saris, are blessed and given gifts just as at any other wedding. The most recent daḍḍuve maduve in 2022 took place in a Hindu temple honouring Ganesha, who holds importance for the Halakki Vokkaliga.

See also
Recognition of same-sex unions in India
Supriyo v. Union Of India

Notes

References

Karnataka
Politics of Karnataka